Israel–Russia relations are the bilateral ties between the State of Israel and the Russian Federation. Israel is represented in Russia through an embassy in Moscow and a consulate-general (to be opened) in Yekaterinburg. Russia is represented in Israel through an embassy in Tel Aviv and a consulate in Haifa.

Russia is a member of the Quartet on the Middle East. For many years, Israel served as a sanctuary for Russian Jews. This was especially the case during the aliyah from the Soviet Union in the 1970s and 1990s. Israel and Russia were on opposing sides during the Cold War. However, the relationship between Israel and Russia began to improve significantly from the early 2000s onwards, with the election of the more pro-Israel Russian leader Vladimir Putin, and in 2001 with election of the more pro-Russia Israeli leader Ariel Sharon.

The Russian language is the third-most widely spoken first language in Israel after Hebrew and Arabic; Israel has the third-largest number of Russian speakers outside of the post-Soviet states, and the highest as a proportion of the total population; in 2017 it was estimated that 1.5 million Israelis could speak Russian, which would amount to 17.25% of the total population of 8.7 million.

Over 100,000 Israeli citizens live in Russia, with 80,000 of them living in Moscow, while hundreds of thousands of Russian citizens reside in Israel, from around 1.5 million Russian-speaking Israelis. In 2022, however, relations between Russia and Israel started experiencing a significant change after the Russian military invasion of Ukraine and during  Yair Lapid's tenure as Prime Minister of Israel.

History

Soviet Union

With the German invasion of Russia in 1941, Joseph Stalin reversed his long-standing opposition to Zionism and tried to mobilize worldwide Jewish support for the Soviet war effort. The Jewish Anti-Fascist Committee was set up in Moscow. Many thousands of Jewish refugees fled the Nazis and entered the Soviet Union during the war, where they reinvigorated Jewish religious activities and opened new synagogues. From late 1944, Stalin adopted an openly pro-Zionist foreign policy apparently in the belief that the new country would be socialist and would speed the decline of British influence in the Middle East.

In May 1947, Soviet Deputy Foreign Minister Andrei Gromyko told the United Nations that the Soviets supported the partition of Palestine into a Jewish and an Arab state. The Soviet Union and its satellite states voted in November 1947 for the UN Partition Plan for Palestine. On 17 May 1948, three days after Israel declared its independence, the Soviets officially recognized Israel.
 
Golda Meir was appointed Israel's ambassador to the Soviet Union, with her term beginning on 2 September 1948 and ending in March 1949. She attended Rosh Hashanah and Yom Kippur services at the Moscow Choral Synagogue. However, once Israel had been established, Stalin reversed positions, favoured the Arabs, arrested the leaders of the Jewish Anti-Fascist Committee, and launched attacks on Soviet Jews.

Relations were severed by the Soviet government in June 1967 in protest of Israeli policy during the Six-Day War and immediately afterward. The Soviet Union supported Israel's Arab enemies with arms and training, and Soviet forces were deployed to Egypt during the War of Attrition in which they repeatedly engaged Israeli forces.

After the Soviets cut off diplomatic relations with Israel due to the Six-Day War, the Dutch embassy in Moscow established an Israel interests' section, which represented Israel in the Soviet Union until diplomatic relations were re-established in October 1991.

After the Soviet Union collapse

The Soviet Union resumed diplomatic relations with Israel on 18 October 1991. The journalist Alexander Bovin became the first Soviet ambassador to Israel in 24 years. After the Soviet Union collapsed two months later, he continued to serve as Russia's ambassador to Israel.

The end of the Soviet Union caused massive immigration wave of Jews from the ex-Soviet states. Demand from the new immigrants caused many Russian-language newspapers to appear, and with the development of the multichannel television in Israel during the 1990s, many Russian channels started being rebroadcast in Israel. In November 2002, a new Israeli-Russian channel, Israel Plus, emerged.

On 19 October 1999, Defence Minister of China, General Chi Haotian, after meeting with Syrian Defense Minister Mustafa Tlass in Damascus, Syria, to discuss expanding military ties between Syria and China, flew to Israel and met with Ehud Barak, the Prime Minister and Defence Minister of Israel, where they discussed military relations. Among the military arrangements was a $1 billion Israeli-Russian sale of military aircraft to China, which were to be jointly produced by Russia and Israel.

In 1999, as Foreign Minister, Ariel Sharon began to court more friendly relations with Russia as a result of the large-scale immigration of Russian-speakers to Israel: "The Russian vote will decide the outcome of the [Israeli] election".

Relations between Israel and Russia were improved by Israeli opposition to the 1999 NATO bombing of Yugoslavia, as well as Israeli support for IMF loans to Russia. Russian Prime Minister Yevgeny Primakov subsequently said that if he was an Israeli, he would vote for incumbent Prime Minister Benjamin Netanyahu in the 1999 Israeli general election.

2000s
The relationship between Israel and Russia substantially began to improve only in 2000, with the election of the more pro-Israel Vladimir Putin, and in 2001, with election of the more pro-Russian Ariel Sharon, who described Putin as "a true friend of Israel".

In 2006, Israeli troops found evidence of Russian made Kornet-E and Metis-M anti-tank systems in Hezbollah's possession in southern Lebanon. In 2007, in response to accusations that it was supplying terrorist groups with weapons, Russia said it was conducting inspections of Syrian weapons storage facilities to prevent the weapons from reaching unintended customers. This strained the already-deteriorating relations between Russia and Israel. In the same year, Vladimir Zhirinovsky visiting as part of a government delegation said that he was concerned particularly about the economic situation for the more than one million Russians living in Israel, and that "Russia will never allow any kind of violence against Israel".

Russia planned to sell advanced surface-to-air missiles to neighboring countries, and condemned Israel's actions in the Gaza War. Russia also sent 60 tons of tent, medicines, food and other humanitarian aid to the Palestinians.

2010s

In 2011, Putin said: "Israel is, in fact, a special state to us. It is practically a Russian-speaking country. Israel is one of the few foreign countries that can be called Russian-speaking. It's apparent that more than half of the population speaks Russian". Putin additionally claimed that Israel could be considered part of the Russian cultural world, and contended that "songs which are considered to be national Israeli songs in Israel are in fact Russian national songs". He further stated that he regarded Russian-speaking Israeli citizens as his compatriots and part of the 'Russian world'.

In April 2014, Israel took a neutral stance on the Russian annexation of Crimea at the United Nations, angering U.S. State Department and White House officials. During Operation Protective Edge in 2014, Putin stated that "I support Israel's battle that is intended to keep its citizens protected". In August, Russia began increasing fruit imports from Israel, after banning food imports from the EU, Norway, United States, Canada and Australia. About two months later India and Israel started to export meat to Russia.

Relations between Israel and Russia further improved after the Russian military intervention in Syria in September 2015. From then until July 2018, Israeli Prime Minister Benjamin Netanyahu and Putin met a total of nine times. In October 2015, Israel and Russia held meetings to coordinate over Syria, and avoid accidentally clashing or scrambling each other's communications while operating over the country.

In March 2016, Putin said the relations with Israel were special and based "on friendship, mutual understanding and the long common history". Putin stated: "Russia and Israel have developed a special relationship. 1.5 million Israeli citizens come from the former Soviet Union, they speak the Russian language, are the bearers of Russian culture, Russian mentality. They maintain relations with their relatives and friends in Russia, and this make the interstate relations very special". In a meeting with Netanyahu in June 2016, Putin described Israel and Russia as "unconditional allies" in "efforts to counter international terrorism".

Prior to and immediately after the 2016 United States presidential election, Israel began lobbying the United States to strike a deal with Russia over restricting the Iranian military presence in Syria in exchange for removing sanctions over Russian military action in Ukraine. Donald Trump was reportedly a favored candidate for both Russia and Israel, as Trump is widely seen, by both, as a strong supporter for Israel yet friendly to Russia.

In December 2016, Netanyahu instructed Israel's UN delegation to skip a General Assembly vote on war crimes committed in Syria, under diplomatic pressure from Russia. The following day, Russian UN Ambassador Vitaly Churkin proposed postponing a vote on Security Council Resolution 2334 to condemn Israeli settlement-building in the West Bank until after the inauguration of U.S. President Donald Trump, in order to allow the new U.S. administration a say on the resolution, but this was rejected by other Security Council members.

In January 2017, Russian Foreign Minister Sergey Lavrov stated that Israel and Russia were "working closely" together in an attempt to stop the extradition of dual Russian-Israeli citizen Alexander Lapshin from Belarus to Azerbaijan.

In March 2018, Israel declined to attribute the poisoning of Sergei and Yulia Skripal to Russia in its statement on the matter and refused to expel any Russian diplomats, drawing criticism from the United Kingdom. In May 2018, Defence Minister Avigdor Lieberman stated the Israeli government had opposed sanctions on Russia despite foreign pressure to support them.

At the 2018 Russia–United States summit in July 2018, U.S. President Donald Trump and Putin agreed to cooperate in Syria to ensure Israel's security. U.S. National Security Advisor John R. Bolton later claimed that both Israel and Russia sought the withdrawal of Iranian forces from Syria. Russia later offered to create a 100 kilometre buffer zone on the Syrian side of the Israel-Syria border which Iranian troops would be barred from, though this offer was rejected by Israel.

In September 2018, relations somewhat deteriorated after the Russian Defense Ministry blamed the Israeli military for the downing of a Russian plane after putting it in the path of Syrian air defence systems during an Israeli strike on Hezbollah targets in Syria. Although Putin initially absolved Israel, Russia subsequently upgraded Syrian air defences to the S-300 missile system over Israeli objections, refused Israeli offers to send a delegation to Moscow to resolve the dispute, and ignored attempts by the Israeli Prime Minister's Office to set up a meeting with Putin.

In December 2018, Russia backed Israel's security concerns over Hezbollah tunnels dug under the Israel-Lebanon border, urging Lebanon to resolve the issue. On 25 December 2018, Russia condemned an Israeli airstrike on a Syrian arms depot, claiming that the "provocative actions of the Israeli air force... directly threatened two airliners."

In December 2018, Israel reversed its stance on Crimea at the United Nations, voting to condemn Russian activity there, with Israeli officials stating it did so at the request of the United States government. However, the following year in August 2019, Netanyahu declined to condemn the annexation of Crimea, stating that he had "nothing to add to what was done at the time" of the annexation, when Israel took a neutral position.

On 7 February 2019, the Russian Deputy Foreign Minister urged Israel to cease its airstrikes in Syria. Relations were repaired after a meeting between Putin and Netanyahu in Moscow on 29 February 2019, after which Netanyahu announced Russian support for removing Iranian fighters from Syria, and that Putin had accepted his offer to visit Jerusalem. On 3 March 2019, Netanyahu announced the establishment of a joint Israeli-Russian team to pursue the withdrawal of all foreign troops deployed in Syria. On 18 March 2019, Putin suggested inviting Netanyahu to Crimea for the opening of a new synagogue there. 

During the period preceding the April 2019 Israeli legislative election, Shin Bet chief Nadav Argaman warned that an unnamed foreign country was planning to interfere in the election, with media speculation focusing on Russia. Russia denied the reports, with Putin's press secretary, Dmitry Peskov stating that it was "out of the question" and suggesting "to not read the Israeli media". Benny Gantz and Tamar Zandberg, the leaders of the opposition parties Blue and White and Meretz respectively, subsequently accused Russia of favouring Netanyahu. Netanyahu later touted his relationship with Putin in campaign billboards prior to the September 2019 Israeli legislative election.

Relations improved after 4 April 2019, when Netanyahu again travelled to Moscow to meet Putin. Putin returned the remains of IDF soldier Zechariah Baumel, which had been recovered by Russian troops in Syria. Netanyahu subsequently thanked Putin for their "personal friendship", while Putin expressed his appreciation for the Israeli policy of honouring Red Army soldiers who fought in World War II. Netanyahu also specifically praised the Russian defense ministry, despite its criticisms of Israel following the downing of a Russian plane the year prior, for its contribution to the retrieval of Baumel's remains, which Netanyahu said Israel would "never forget". On 25 June 2019, Israel convened its first trilateral summit between its national security adviser and his respective American and Russian counterparts, specifically focusing on the Iranian military presence in Syria.

In October 2019, Russia arrested Israeli national, Naama Issachar for alleged drug smuggling. Issachar's family and Israeli officials claimed that Russia had told them she could be released if Aleksei Burkov, a Russian national pending extradition from Israel to the United States, was released to Russia. Netanyahu subsequently personally requested a pardon for Issachar from Putin, which Putin said he would consider. Israel's High Court ultimately rejected Burkov's appeal against his extradition, leading Russia to condemn the decision as "a breach ... of Israel's international obligations", claiming that the decision "does not contribute to the development of [Russian-Israeli] relations". On 29 January 2020, President Putin signed her pardon. Her attorney previously noted that no convicted foreigner was ever pardoned by a Russian President before. The Russian pardon was reportedly made in exchange for a transfer of ownership of the Alexander Courtyard in Jerusalem to the Russian Orthodox Church.

In December 2019, Netanyahu once again emphasised the importance of his personal relationship with Putin, stating that Putin had told him their countries could have had a military confrontation had it not been for their regular meetings.

2020s
In January 2020, Russian president Vladimir Putin was in Israel for a one-day visit for the 75th anniversary of the liberation of the Auschwitz death camp.

On 10 January 2020, Israel released two Syrian prisoners, including one convicted of espionage, as part of a "gesture of goodwill" in a deal brokered by Russia. On 15 January 2020, an Asia Times report cited an Israeli foreign ministry official as stating that Russia expected Israeli diplomatic assistance in ending Western sanctions on the Syrian government in return for permitting the continuation of Israeli airstrikes in Syria. According from the Times of Israel, an Israeli organization, Hadassah, was involved in an effort which led to Russia's development of vaccine during the COVID-19 outbreak, shortly after Putin declared Russia was the first country to produce successful anti-COVID vaccine. In November 2020, Israeli Prime Minister Benjamin Netanyahu spoke about the possibility of purchasing the Russian-made Sputnik V vaccine. The Haddasah Medical Center then signed a commercial memorandum of understanding to obtain 1.5 to 3 million doses. On 15 December 2020, Russian Foreign Minister Sergey Lavrov praised the 2020 normalisation of relations between Israel and several Arab states, describing it as a "positive phenomenon".

In the same month, relations deteriorated after the Russian Ambassador to Israel, Anatoly Viktorov, defended Iran, criticized Israeli "noncompliance with UN resolutions in the Israel-Arab and Israel-Palestinian conflict" and disputed Israeli claims that Hezbollah had constructed underground tunnels from Lebanon. This led the Israeli Foreign Ministry to rebuke Viktorov, with Foreign Minister Gabi Ashkenazi stating, "Israel does not accept these statements and thus I hope we will bring an end to such embarrassing and unacceptable statements between us and Russia". Viktorov subsequently partially backtracked, claiming that he had been quoted out of context and did not mean to suggest Israel was a greater destabilizing factor than Iran. Russian Foreign Ministry spokeswoman Maria Zakharova described the Israeli reaction as "overly sensitive" and backed Viktorov's remarks, stating, "All statements by the Russian ambassador quoted in the publication are in line with Russia's well-known position on the Middle East." However, she reaffirmed that Russia was "committed to continue taking into account Israel's security concerns in the decision-making process".

On 21 January 2021, Russian Foreign Minister Sergey Lavrov stated at a press conference that Israel should inform Russia about potential threats it faces from Syria rather than bombing them, and Russia "will take every measure to neutralise the threat" that Israel faces from Iran's presence in Syria.

In a congratulatory message following the victory of Isaac Herzog in the June 2021 Israeli presidential election, Putin noted "friendly relations" between Russia and Israel. Putin expressed a desire for "further development of multifaceted and constructive bilateral cooperation, including interaction in international affairs" as something that would be in "our peoples’ fundamental interests". Putin expressed similar sentiments in a congratulatory message to Naftali Bennett, following the start of his tenure as Prime Minister in June 2021. Putin also sent a thank you letter to outgoing Prime Minister Netanyahu, praising Netanyahu for the "great work [he has] invested in strengthening the ties between our nations in many areas" and stating that Netanyahu's "capabilities and experience will always be an asset to Israel". Upon receiving the letter, Netanyahu reportedly told Russian Ambassador Viktorov to "Tell President Putin that I will be back soon", with Kremlin spokesman Dmitry Peskov noting the long relationship between the two leaders.

Putin has urged the Bennett government to "pursue a policy of continuity on Russian-Israel relations" from the warm ties during the Netanyahu era. Following their first meeting in October 2021, Bennett described Putin as a "true friend of the Jewish people", noting that him and Putin discussed "ways to deal with Islamic fundamentalism". During the meeting, Putin reportedly asked Bennett for his diplomatic assistance in easing U.S. sanctions on Syria, pitching the proposal as a means of decreasing Iranian economic influence in Syria. Putin also declined an proposal by Bennett to host a Russia-Ukraine summit in Jerusalem, harshly criticizing Ukrainian President Volodymyr Zelenskyy.

In February 2022, the Ukrainian Ambassador to Israel claimed Israeli Foreign Minister Yair Lapid "reiterates rhetoric of Russian propaganda", after Lapid said that Israeli officials "don't see a violent confrontation soon" between Ukraine and Russia. The Israeli Foreign Ministry subsequently summoned the Ukrainian Ambassador for an official reprimand. The Israeli Ministry of Defense also preemptively informed the Baltic countries of Lithuania, Latvia and Estonia that it would not permit the transfer of Israeli-made weaponry to Ukraine, in order to placate Russia. Israel also rejected a U.S. request to sell the Iron Dome air defense system to Ukraine, citing the need to avoid conflict with Russia.

In February 2022, Russia turned down an Israeli demand to remove electromagnetic interference from its Syrian air station on planes landing in Tel Aviv, complicating tensions between the two countries.

On 24 February 2022, Israeli Minister of Foreign Affairs Yair Lapid spoke out against the Russian invasion of Ukraine, stating "Russia's attack against Ukraine is a serious violation of international order. Israel condemns it and is prepared to extend humanitarian aid to Ukrainian citizens".

On 18 April 2022, Putin wrote a letter to Bennett demanding that Russia be granted control over the Alexander Courtyard in Jerusalem, as per an earlier agreement with former Prime Minister Netanyahu. Following an Israeli court ruling annulling Netanyahu's agreement, the final decision on the transfer was left to former Prime Minister Bennett. The notice of alleged legal violations of the Jewish Agency in Russia is a major blow to diplomatic relations between the two nations.

On 6 February 2023, it was reported that Russia had relayed a Syrian request for aid from Israel following the 2023 Turkey–Syria earthquake, which was subsequently accepted by Israel.

2022 Ukraine invasion and mediation efforts 
On 24 February 2022, Israeli Foreign Minister Yair Lapid condemned the Russian invasion of Ukraine as a "violation of world order." Despite not repeating Lapid's condemnation of Russia, Israeli Prime Minister Naftali Bennett expressed support for Ukraine, stating "our hearts are with the civilians who through no fault of their own have been thrust into this situation," and also offered humanitarian assistance to Ukraine as well.

Lapid's remarks were criticized by Opposition Leader Benjamin Netanyahu, who urged the Israeli government "to speak less about what they don't need to talk about" on Russia and accused the government of "too many unnecessary expressions and too many false predictions". Russia subsequently summoned the Israeli Ambassador to Russia to clarify Israel's position. The Russian Ambassador to Israel, Anataloy Viktorov, encouraged Israel to "stay wise and diplomatic and continue our joint work for the benefits of our countries and people", stating that he had provided Israel with "a number of materials" explaining the Russian invasion of Ukraine, and noting the Russian recognition of "Israel's legitimate security concerns" in Syria.

Israel declined to co-sponsor a UN Security Council resolution condemning the Russian invasion, leading to an expression of disappointment by the United States. Israel later voted in favour of a UN General Assembly resolution condemning the invasion. At the request of the United States, Israel also pushed the United Arab Emirates to back the resolution. Russia subsequently expressed strong dissatisfaction to the Israeli Foreign Ministry over Israel's support of the UN General Assembly resolution.

On 5 March 2022, Israeli Prime Minister Naftali Bennett flew to Moscow to have a three-hour meeting with Putin about the situation in Ukraine, after which Bennett spoke to Zelenskyy by phone and flew to Germany to meet with Chancellor Olaf Scholz. Bennett also brought up the subject of the significant Jewish community caught up in the Ukraine conflict during their three-hour discussion in the Kremlin, according to the Israeli source.

On 11 March 2022, the Ukrainian Ambassador to Israel stated that President Zelenskyy "does not" understand the Israeli refusal to provide defensive aid to Ukraine and accused Israel of being "afraid" of Russia's "few airplanes and anti-missile systems in Syria". He described Israeli mediation of the conflict as an excuse for not providing active support to Ukraine. Israel also immediately rejected a Ukrainian request for cyber weaponry, including Pegasus, to be used against Russia.

An unnamed senior Ukrainian official accused Bennett of having "proposed that we surrender", claiming that Bennett urged Zelenskyy to "take the offer" of a peace deal from Putin. This report was subsequently denied by both the Israeli Prime Minister's office and a senior adviser to Zelenskyy.

The United States has publicly urged Israel to back Western sanctions against Russia, with Under Secretary of State for Political Affairs Victoria Nuland calling on Israel not "to become the last haven for dirty money that's fueling Putin's wars".

On 12 March 2022, Ukrainian Defense Minister Oleksiy Reznikov accused Israel of "unexplained indifference and unwillingness to take a side in the war" between Ukraine and Russia.

On 16 March 2022, Russian Foreign Minister Sergey Lavrov noted that Russia viewed Israeli mediation favourably, due to Israel not joining Western sanctions against Russia. However, Israel has affirmed that it will not allow itself to be used by Russian nationals to evade U.S. sanctions.

Following the Bucha massacre, Israeli Finance Minister Avigdor Lieberman condemned "war crimes" but declined to condemn Russia specifically, noting "mutual accusations" where "Russia blames Ukraine and Ukraine blames Russia", drawing a rebuke from the Ukrainian Ambassador to Israel. However, Foreign Minister Lapid stated that "Russian forces committed war crimes". Israel subsequently voted for a resolution to suspend Russia from the United Nations Human Rights Council. The Russian Foreign Ministry condemned the vote and Lapid's remarks, stating that it had "taken note of Israeli Foreign Minister Yair Lapid's aggressive statements" and that they "evoke regret and rejection". The Russian Foreign Ministry also summoned the Israeli Ambassador, but declined to issue a formal diplomatic rebuke.

On 12 April 2022, Defense Minister Benny Gantz cited "regional considerations", including the "area border with Russia, practically speaking, over the skies of Syria and Lebanon", for its decision not to send military aid to Ukraine or join Western sanctions on Russia.

On 20 April 2022, Gantz announced Israel would send protective equipment such as flak jackets and helmets to the Ukrainian emergency services, but not to the Ukrainian military. The Russian Ambassador warned Israel that Russia would respond "accordingly" if military aid was provided.

A diplomatic row was sparked in May 2022, after Lavrov suggested that Hitler "had Jewish blood" and the "biggest antisemites tend to be Jews" in his critique of Ukrainian President Zelensky. Lapid described Lavrov's remarks as "unforgivable" and the "basest level of racism", demanding the "use of the Holocaust of the Jewish people for political purposes must stop immediately". The Israeli Foreign Ministry subsequently summoned the Russian Ambassador to Israel and demanded an apology. The Russian Foreign Ministry responded by describing Lapid's comments as "anti-historical" and "explaining to a large extent why the current Israeli government supports the neo-Nazi regime in Kyiv". President Putin subsequently apologized for Lavrov's remarks on a call with Prime Minister Bennett, and Bennett stated that he had "thanked [Putin] for clarifying the president's view of the Jewish people and the memory of the Holocaust".

On 6 July 2022, Israeli officials stated that Israel was no longer involved in mediation efforts between Ukraine and Russia. Bennett later suggested that disagreement with the United States and the United Kingdom, which advocated a more "aggressive approach", along with the Bucha massacre, had led to the failure of Israeli-mediated peace talks.

On 21 July 2022, it was reported that the Russian Ministry of Justice is demanding the closure of the Jewish Agency for Israel in Russia. According to a report in the Russian news agency Interfax, the Ministry of Justice's request, which was submitted to the Moscow District Court, is related to "unspecified violations of Russian law." This move led to a diplomatic crisis with Israel, after there is unanimity at the governmental level in Israel that the Kremlin is leveraging the issue in light of Israel's harsh condemnations of Russia following the latter's invasion of Ukraine. The Russian Embassy in Cairo accused Prime Minister Lapid of "lies" about Russian involvement in the Bucha massacre and condemned his "complete disregard and contempt for the lives of Palestinians". The situation was described by Bloomberg News as the "worst rift in relations between Russia and Israel since the Soviet Union's collapse". Opposition leader Benjamin Netanyahu condemned Lapid and Gantz for the deterioration in relations, stating that they were "endangering our national security" and that his "measured, balanced and responsible relationship" with Russia as Prime Minister was "being undermined before our eyes in recent weeks". Finance Minister Avigdor Lieberman criticised the "slightly obsessive and hysterical" response by Lapid to the Russian actions.

The former president of Russia, Dimitri Medvedev, claimed that shipping Israeli weapons to Ukraine would "destroy" the diplomatic relationship between the two countries, following discussions on the shipment of Israeli weapons to Ukraine after Russia repeatedly attacked it with Iranian HESA Shahed 136 kamikaze drones. Medvedev's warning came in response to statements by Israeli Diaspora Minister Nachman Shai, who called for military assistance to Ukraine.

Following Netanyahu's victory in the 2022 Israeli legislative election, Russia adopted a conciliatory tone, suggesting that Netanyahu has "a common approach toward further developing bilateral relations".

On 14 November 2022, Israel abstained on a UN General Assembly vote supporting a mechanism for Russia to pay reparations to Ukraine, breaking with the United States and the European Union.

In January 2023, Israel refused a U.S. request to transfer MIM-23 Hawk batteries and anti-ballistic missiles to Ukraine.

On 30 January 2023, Netanyahu expressed interest in taking a mediating role in the conflict, if this was supported by Russia, Ukraine and the United States.

Regional cooperation

Russia's improvement of relations with Israel coincided on the same time with growing Russia and Israel's alliance with Saudi Arabia, Egypt and the United Arab Emirates, both have common opposition toward neo-Ottomanism initiated by Turkish President Recep Tayyip Erdoğan, both countries are also fighting proxy wars with Turkey in Caucasus, North Africa and the Middle East. Israel has largely sided with Russia against Turkey in recent years, notably by how Russia and Israel support Khalifa Haftar against Turkey-backed Government of National Accord, Israel's silent support for Russian intervention in Syria in opposition to Iran and Turkey, although Israel objects Russia's relations with Turkey while Israel maintains relations with Azerbaijan, a strong Turkish ally, to go against Iran. In 2018, Israel had also suggested, alongside Saudi Arabia and the United Arab Emirates, that U.S. President Donald Trump should improve relations with Russia and rethink about sanctions relating Russo-Ukrainian War, as Ukraine is Turkey's ally. Although Putin continues to have positive relations with Erdogan. Both Turkey and Israel were involved in rival mediation efforts between Ukraine and Russia in early 2022, but these were not coordinated.

When normalization agreement was signed by Serbia and Kosovo in 2020, Russia and Israel openly supported the deal which would allow Serbia to move embassy to Jerusalem while Kosovo would establish relations with Israel. In response, In August 2020, following the Abraham Accords which Israel normalised relations with the United Arab Emirates and Bahrain, Russia did not endorse the deal but quietly approved the efforts by Israel to normalize the relations. Iran does not recognize Kosovo as a sovereign state, and both Iran and Turkey opposed both moves.

However, Russia continues to have strong economic and political relations with both Iran and Turkey, and Russia continues to be skeptical about Israel's special relations with the United States. Russia supports two-state solution for Israeli–Palestinian conflict and has relations with several Palestinian political parties. Russia does not consider Hamas as a terrorist organization and continues to diplomatically negotiate with them. Iran, Russia, and Turkey all voted in favor of United Nations General Assembly resolution ES-10/L.22 to declare the status of Jerusalem as Israel's capital as "null and void." Russia continues to seek multilateral relations in the Middle East with both Israel's allies and rivals.

Expatriate communities

Russian language in Israel 

The native Russian-speaking population of Israel is the world's third-largest population of Russian native-speakers living outside the former Soviet Union territories, and the highest as a proportion of the population. The number of native Russian-speaking Israelis numbers around 1.5 million citizens.

Russian citizens living in Israel 

Hundreds of thousands of Russian-Israeli citizens live in Israel. During Russian elections, the Russian government sets up polling stations across many Israeli cities as well as smaller towns, in order to enable the Russian citizens who are living in Israel to cast their vote. During the 2012 Russian Presidential elections, hundreds of thousands of Russian-Israelis could cast their vote in Israel.

In the 2018 Russian Presidential Election, Vladimir Putin was the most popular candidate within Russian Israeli voters, winning 72.62% of the vote in Israel, with Ksenia Sobchak coming in second place with 13.42%. However, despite Russia setting up 14 polling stations in Israel, voter turnout was particularly low, with less than 10% of eligible Russian Israeli dual citizens in Israel showing up to vote on the day.

The political party United Russia has opened an overseas branch in Israel. The Liberal Democratic Party of Russia also previously had an overseas branch in Israel.

Victory Day in Israel 

Israel hosts the most extensive Victory Day celebrations outside the former Soviet Union. Due to the large number of Red Army veterans who retired to Israel from former Soviet countries, the Russian government and military regularly send delegations to meet with the Red Army veterans associations in Israel, as well as to take part in the annual Victory Day events.

Israeli community of Moscow 
Moscow has the largest Israeli expatriate community in the world, with 80,000 Israeli citizens living in the city as of 2014, almost all of them native Russian-speakers. Many Israeli cultural events are hosted for the community, and many live part of the year in Israel. To cater to the Israeli community, Israeli cultural centres are located in Moscow, Saint Petersburg, Novosibirsk and Yekaterinburg. There are 60 flights a week between Tel Aviv and Moscow.

Military collaboration
In 1991, the Soviet Union offered to sell Israel its Mikoyan MiG-31 aircraft and S-300 missile system, although the deal never materialised.

In 2004, a three-way deal was signed between Israel, Russia and India: Israel supplied the $1.1 billion EL/W-2090 radar to the Indian Air Force, with the radar fitted onto the Ilyushin Il-76 platform by Russia.

On 6 September 2010, Russia and Israel signed a five-year military agreement.

In December 2019, Israel revealed it had an agreement with Russia not to sell arms to Ukraine and Georgia, in exchange for Russia refraining from selling arms to Iran.

Drones 
In April 2009, Russia purchased its first package of drones from Israel (the Bird Eye-400, eight I-View Mk150 and two Searcher Mk.2 UAVs). The deal was worth $53 million.

In a second deal, at the end of 2009, Russia purchased an additional 36 drones from Israel, in a deal worth $100 million.

In October 2010, in a third deal, Russia purchased an additional $400 million of drones from Israel Aerospace Industries. The Israeli drones are to be assembled in Russia. The production of the Russian-Israeli drones began in 2012, with delivery to the Russian military scheduled for 2014.

In 2015, one of the drones was reportedly shot down by the Ukrainian military near the city of Donetsk, Ukraine.

In September 2015, the Russian Army purchased another $300 million package of drones from Israel, its fourth purchase of Israeli drones.

Russian tourism to Israel 

Israel became in recent years a destination for Russian tourists. The city of Tel Aviv in particular is a popular destination in Russia due to its ease for Russian-speakers, warm weather, and beaches. According to polls, Russian tourist satisfaction after visiting Israel was found to be significantly higher than the average, compared with lower satisfaction ratings from tourists from other countries visiting Israel. Almost 500,000 Russian tourists visited Israel in 2014. However, in 2015, Russian tourist numbers to Israel fell dramatically due to the economic crisis in Russia and the fall in the value of the ruble. The 2015 economic crisis in Russia precipitated a crisis in Israel's tourism industry, because Russians represented the second largest share of Israel's tourists. (after Americans) The level of tourism from Russia to Israel continued to fall significantly in 2015. By 2018, after years of downturn, Russian tourist numbers to Israel had begun to slightly recover, with Russian tourists once again the second largest body of foreign tourists in Israel, and being particularly important for the resort town of Eilat.

Over 400,000 pilgrims from Russia visited Israel in 2015–2016, said Patriarch Kirill of Moscow. Patriarch Kirill said that the fact that "people in Israel speak Russian creates a special atmosphere for our pilgrims, and they often feel at home in Israel". Speaking about the life of the Jewish community in Russia, he cited the chief rabbi of Russia: "He has told me many times that he does not know any other such place than Russia, where Christians and Jews have such good relations".

Russian oil supplies to Israel 
As of 2014, Russia is Israel's largest supplier of crude oil (alongside Kazakhstan and Azerbaijan). As of 2016, Russia was Israel's main supplier of oil.

Israel–Russia visa-free agreement 
In 2008, Israel and Russia signed the visa-free agreement, allowing mutual visa-free travel between the two countries. Immigrants from Russia and other former Soviet republics account for a significant proportion of Israel's citizens, meaning that visits to friends and relatives in Russia are likely to be facilitated.

Customs union talks 
Israel plans to enter a free-trade agreement with Russia. The Customs Union, bringing together Belarus, Kazakhstan and Russia, and Israel have launched an exploratory committee to study the prospects for the creation of a free trade zone, the Eurasian Economic Commission (EEC – a single permanent regulatory body of the Customs Union) reported in March 2014.

Encrypted communication line 

Russia and Israel have agreed to install a direct encrypted communication network, to facilitate communications between the Russian President and Israeli Prime Minister.  One analyst says: "Russia feels very close to the Israeli leadership... The Russians want to speak to Israel without anyone eavesdropping."

Medical collaboration

Joint training
Israel and Russia partake in joint medical training of specialists. The Moscow Government has implemented a training program for metropolitan doctors and nurses to train in the leading Israeli hospitals: Hadassah Medical Center, Tel Aviv Sourasky Medical Center, Sheba Medical Center, and Ramat Aviv Medical Center.  Several hundred Russian medical specialists from Moscow hospitals are trained in Israel each year.

Hadassah Medical Center
Beginning in 2018, Israel's Hadassah Medical Center, in agreement with the Mayor of Moscow, opened a branch in Skolkovo, becoming the first foreign hospital to open in Russia. The Hadassah project in Russia was estimated at $40.2 million, of which about $26.4 million will go to equip the center with equipment. In addition, $3.2 million will be spent on educational activities.  It is planned that 10% of the income generated by Israel's Hadassah medical center in Skolkovo will be directed to research activities in the field of oncology.

Scientific collaboration agreements

Space 

In 2011, Israel and Russia signed the Space Co-operation Agreement. The framework agreement is meant to develop joint research programs and other collaborations in areas like astrophysical and planetary research, space biology and medicine, navigational satellites and launching services and technology.

Nuclear technology 
In 2013, the Israeli and Russian government signed agreements to collaborate on nuclear imaging and the development of radioactive materials for dental treatments. Although the agreement is limited to medical treatments, it could form the basis for wider collaboration for ventures between the two countries in nuclear technology.

Technology incubators 
In the field of technology incubators, collaborative projects are being establish between the two states. Rusnano,  the Russian government's vehicle for investments in nanotechnology, has established a branch in Israel, with the aim of setting up a fund for investment in Israeli nanotechnology ventures. Similarly, Russia's Skolkovo innovation center has established a branch in Israel, the Israel-Skolkovo Gateway/Center (IsraelSK), which involves raising private capital and government grants leveraging for Israeli and Russian start-up companies.

In 2016, Igor Drozdev, chairman of the board of the Skolkovo Foundation, signed a cooperation agreement with the Mayor of Yokneam, with the aim of collaboration in the development of technology between the two countries.

In 2018, Yandex opened a computer science school in Israel for local students, in collaboration with Tel Aviv University's department of Computer Science. The school subsidized by Yandex, which will teach 50 Israeli students a year, will focus primarily in "machine learning". Joseph Klafter, president of Tel Aviv University, said: "The new joint educational program will help develop the IT sphere and national economies of both Russia and Israel."

Plekhanov Russian University of Economics hold a joint course in blockchain development with the Israeli School of IT and Israel's HackerU.

See also

International recognition of Israel
Soviet Union and the Arab–Israeli conflict
History of the Jews in Russia
Jewish Autonomous Oblast
Russia and the Arab–Israeli conflict
Palestine-Russia relations
Antisemitism in Russia
Antisemitism in the Soviet Union
Antisemitism in the Russian Empire
Russian people in Israel
Russian Jews in Israel
Russian language in Israel
Church of Mary Magdalene
Russian Compound

References

External links

Embassy of Israel in Moscow
Embassy of the Russian federation in Israel

 
Russia
Bilateral relations of Russia